After sending away royal appointed governor of the Viceroyalty of Peru, Blasco Núñez Vela and later defeating and killing him in the battle of Añaquito, Gonzalo Pizarro assembled an army of 1,200 men to press claims for the rule over Peru, once belonging to him and his brothers. The new viceroy, Pedro de la Gasca, landed in Peru in 1547, and a contingent of his troops, led by Diego Centeno, was severely defeated at Huarina by Francisco de Carvajal (dubbed the Deamon of the Andes, for his treatment of native Peruvians in his quest for glory and power.) 

Centeno, however, remained successful in retreating in order and later united with the main force under de la Gasca.  Ultimately, the viceroy won the cause of most of Gonzalo Pizarro's officers and men, and on April 9, 1548, the pizarrists were finally overthrown in the battle of Jaquijahuana.

Notes

References

.

Spanish conquests in the Americas
Battles involving Spain
Battles involving the Inca Empire
History of Bolivia
Conflicts in 1547
1547 in the Viceroyalty of Peru
1547 in the Spanish Empire